William Reeve may refer to:
 William Reeve (composer), English theatre composer and organist
 William Reeve (bishop), Anglican priest
 William Reeve (missionary), missionary to India
 William Reeve (rower), English rower

See also
 William Reeves (disambiguation)